Pause is the first live album by P-Model. It was recorded at the final show by the "defrosted" lineup. It is part of a pair of conceptual takes on a live album, alongside The Way of Live: On this album, Hirasawa presented the show as an audience member would have heard it, and as such most technical glitches and leaked backstage audio heard at the concert was kept for the release.

Track listing

Tracks 3-4, 6-10, 12 & 16 arranged by Hirasawa, tracks 1-2, 5, 13-15 & 17 arranged by Kotobuki, track 11 arranged by Akiyama. P-Model also performed "Biiig Eye", "Homo Gestalt", "Vista" (all written and arranged by Hirasawa) and "Burning Brain" (written and arranged by Akiyama) on the show.

Personnel
Susumu Hirasawa - Vocals, Electric guitar
Katsuhiko Akiyama  - Synthesizer, Vocals, Bass on "Fu-Ru-He-He-He"
Hikaru Kotobuki - Synthesizers, Vocals
Yasuchika Fujii - Electronic drums
Masanori Chinzei - Engineering

Release history

References

External links
 
 PAUSE at NO ROOM - The official site of Susumu Hirasawa (P-MODEL)

P-Model albums
1994 live albums
DIW Records live albums
Japanese-language albums